Douglas Craig Dascenzo (born June 30, 1964) is an American professional baseball coach. The former Major League Baseball outfielder played for the Chicago Cubs, Texas Rangers, and San Diego Padres, where he began his coaching career. He spent 2014 as a third base coach for the Atlanta Braves, and is currently a coach for the Chicago Cubs affiliate Tennessee Smokies.

Playing career
He is an alumnus of Oklahoma State University and a graduate of Brownsville Area High School in Brownsville, Pennsylvania. Drafted by the Chicago Cubs in the 12th round of the 1985 MLB amateur draft, Dascenzo would make his Major League Baseball debut with the Chicago Cubs on September 2, 1988, and appear in his final game on September 29, 1996.

Dascenzo began his Major League career by playing in a then-National League record 241 consecutive games without making an error. The streak spanned from his debut in 1988 to the 1991 season, when he committed his first error in a game on August 25. He finished his career with a .990 fielding percentage
playing at all three outfield positions, committing only eight errors in 792 total chances.

During the 1990 and 1991 seasons with the Chicago Cubs, Dascenzo made a total of four appearances as a relief pitcher.  He pitched for a total of five innings, giving up three hits, two bases on balls, and achieving two strike outs.

Coaching career

Dascenzo ended his career as a member of the San Diego Padres organization after the 1996 season and took a job with the team as a roving minor league instructor. He made his managerial debut with the Padres' Northwest League affiliate, the Eugene Emeralds, in 2006 where he guided the Ems to a 43-33 finish. He was promoted to manage the Fort Wayne Wizards in the Midwest League in 2007. In 2009, the Wizards became the Fort Wayne TinCaps which he led to the Midwest League championship in the 2009 season, after they swept the Burlington Bees, 3–0.

On December 1, 2009, Dascenzo was named the manager of the Double-A San Antonio Missions of the Texas League.  He was named Texas League Manager of the Year (2011) after leading the Missions to the Texas League Championship.

In October 2011, Doug accepted a position with the Atlanta Braves as their minor league base running and outfield coordinator.

On October 14, 2013, Dascenzo was promoted from the Minor Leagues to the Majors, given the position of third base coach due to Brian Snitker being promoted to the manager of the Braves Triple-A club. He was fired by the Braves at the end of the 2014 season and was replaced by Bo Porter. On October 9, 2014, Dascenzo was hired by the Chicago Cubs to serve as an outfield and first base coach. In 2016, he was the outfield coach only.

References

External links

Baseball players from Cleveland
1964 births
Living people
Atlanta Braves coaches
Baseball players from Pennsylvania
Charlotte Knights players
Chicago Cubs coaches
Chicago Cubs players
Eugene Emeralds managers
Geneva Cubs players
Iowa Cubs players
Las Vegas Stars (baseball) players
Major League Baseball outfielders
Major League Baseball third base coaches
Mobile BayBears players
Norfolk Tides players
Oklahoma City 89ers players
Oklahoma State Cowboys baseball players
People from Fayette County, Pennsylvania
Pittsfield Cubs players
St. Paul Saints players
San Antonio Missions managers
San Diego Padres players
Texas Rangers players
Winston-Salem Spirits players
FSC Jacksonville Blue Wave baseball players